Now Summer 2007 is a compilation CD released by EMI Music Australia in late 2006. Like most Australian summer compilations, it is released in December and is meant to carry on throughout January and February (the three months of summer). It has two CDs which no other NOW CD in Australia has. Now Summer 2007 is the 15th CD of the Australian Now! series.

Track listing

Disk 1
Robbie Williams – "Rudebox" (3:47)
Bob Sinclar – "Rock This Party (Everybody Dance Now)" (3:17)
Cassie – "Me & U" (3:13)
Eskimo Joe – "Sarah" (3:30)
Lily Allen – "LDN" (3:11)
Sean Paul – "(When You Gonna) Give It Up to Me" (4:12)
OK Go – "Here It Goes Again" (2:59)
Panic! at the Disco – "But It's Better If You Do" (3:25)
Jet – "Put Your Money Where Your Mouth Is" (2:36)
Nerina Pallot – "Everybody's Gone to War" (3:53)
Sick Puppies – "All the Same" (3:27)
Sneaky Sound System – "I Love It" (3:48)
Basement Jaxx – "Hush Boy" (3:40)
Missy Elliott – "We Run This" (3:25)
Kelis featuring Too Short – "Bossy" (3:30)
Little Birdy – "Come On Come On" (3:53)
Something with Numbers – "Apple of the Eye (Lay Me Down)" (3:30)
Michael Gray featuring Shelly Poole – "Borderline" (3:14)
The Similou – "All This Love" (Tonite Only Edit) (3:28)
Freestylers – "In Love with You" (3:32)
Vandalism – "Twisted" (2:29)
Coldplay – "White Shadows" (5:29)

Disk 2
The Veronicas – "Leave Me Alone" (3:31)
Thirty Seconds to Mars – "The Kill" (3:31)
Paris Hilton – "Nothing in This World" (3:10)
LeToya – "Torn" (3:59)
Chingy featuring Tyrese – "Pullin' Me Back" (3:52)
Amiel – "Be Your Girl" (Bass Kleph Remix) (3:35)
Dannii Minogue – "So Under Pressure" (3:20)
Supafly Inc. – "Moving Too Fast" (3:02)
Kortezman – "My Love" (3:04)
Bob Evans – "Nowhere Without You" (4:10)
Kasey Chambers – "Surrender" (3:53)
Paolo Nutini – "Last Request" (3:39)
James Blunt – "No Bravery" (3:55)
Vanlustbäder – "Here We Go Again" (3:15)
Sarah McLeod – "He Doesn't Love You" (Hook n Sling Radio Edit) (3:40)
Princess Superstar – "Perfect" (Michi Lange's Sidekick Edit) (3:28)
Krafty Kuts featuring Yolanda Be Cool – "Tell Me How You Feel" (Young Punx Radio Edit) (3:06)
Roger Sanchez – "Lost" (S–Man Radio Edit) (3:42)
Cascada – "Everytime We Touch" (3:17)
Supermode – "Tell Me Why" (2:50)
Celebrity Drug Disasters – "Getting Better" (3:34)
Peter Bjorn and John – "Young Folks" (4:38)

External links
 NOW Summer 2007 @ Australian Charts

2006 compilation albums
EMI Records compilation albums
Now That's What I Call Music! albums (Australian series)